Martin Kraus (born 24 October 1993) is an Austrian footballer who currently plays for Wiener Neustädter.

External links
 
 

1993 births
Living people
Austrian footballers
SK Rapid Wien players
SC Ritzing players
SK Austria Klagenfurt players
Wiener Sport-Club players
SC Wiener Neustadt players
FC Admira Wacker Mödling players
2. Liga (Austria) players
Austrian Regionalliga players
Association football goalkeepers
People from Mödling
Footballers from Lower Austria